Richard Valentine Burkhauser is a Professor Emeritus of Policy Analysis at Cornell University and was a member of the Council of Economic Advisers, CEA, for President Trump. Burkhauser's research often focuses on how public policies affect the economic well-being of vulnerable populations, such as the elderly, the disabled, and those living in low-income households. As a member of the CEA, Burkhauser was working alongside fellow economists Tomas Philipson and Kevin Hassett.

Since 1977 Burkhauser has written seventeen books and countless book reviews, articles, and government publications. 
Burkhauser has often presented his research findings on the consequences of disability policy to Congressional committees and other government agencies.

References

Year of birth missing (living people)
Living people
Saint Vincent College alumni
University of Chicago alumni
Rutgers University alumni
Trump administration personnel
Cornell University faculty
United States Council of Economic Advisers